Narayansami Sathyamurthy (born July 10, 1951 in Sethur, Puducherry, India) is a chemist in India. He is the founding director of the Indian Institute of Science Education and Research (IISER), Mohali, Punjab, India and the President of Chemical Research Society of India.

Education
Sathyamurthy completed his B.Sc. and M.Sc. degrees from Annamalai University. Sathyamurthy moved to the United States where he obtained his Ph.D degree working with L.M.Raff at Oklahoma State University in 1975. He further carried out postdoctoral research in nobel laureate J.C.Polanyi's laboratory. After that Sathyamurthy joined the Indian Institute of Technology Kanpur as a lecturer in 1978. Sathyamurthy became a professor in 1985.

Contribution to Chemical Science
Sathyamurthy has contributed in the field of Theoretical chemistry, Molecular reaction dynamics, Computational chemistry. He and his group has made notable contributions on the sensitivity of molecular reaction dynamics, accuracy of the potential energy surface, effect of reagent rotation, vibration and orientation on reaction cross section, chaos and fractals in chemical dynamics, reactive scattering resonances in atom-molecule collisions, transition state spectrum, isotope effect on Raman excitation profiles, channel control in chemical reactions, vibration mediated photodissociation, structure and stability of water clusters, water molecules in a confined environment, blue shift in stretching frequency of molecules in a confined environment, host–guest interaction in endohedral fullerenes, stacking and spreading interaction in N-heteroaromatic systems, intra- and inter- molecular hydrogen bond, and atomic and molecular clusters as designer materials for the nanoworld.

Awards and honours

Young Scientist Medal, Indian National Science Academy, New Delhi 1980
Rev. Yedanapalli Memorial Award, Indian Chemical Society 1989
S.S. Bhatnagar Prize in Chemical Sciences, Council of Scientific & Industrial Research, New Delhi 1990
Fellow, Indian Academy of Sciences, Bangalore 1990
Fellow, Indian National Science Academy, New Delhi 1992
Sir C.V. Raman Award, Hari Om Ashram Trust, University Grants Commission, New Delhi 1997
FICCI Award, New Delhi 2001
Silver Medal, Chemical Research Society of India, Bangalore 2001
Professor Navneetha Rao Best Teacher Award, Andhra Pradesh Academy of Sciences, Hyderabad 2003
Fellow, Third World Academy of Sciences, Trieste, Italy 2005
J. C. Bose National Fellow, Department of Science and Technology, New Delhi, 2006
Founding Director, Indian Institute of Science Education and Research, Mohali, 2007-2017

References

N. Sath
Rajya Sabha TV Program: Eureka with Narayanasami Sathyamurthy
IISER,Mohali
Dr. N. Sathyamurthy
HT Spotlight: IISER putting Mohali on India's knowledge map
Interview: Prof. N. Sathyamurthy, Director, IISER Mohali
N SATHYAMURTHY, Articles written in Journal of Chemical Sciences
Why Join an IISER?
TWAS Biodata
SERB

Scientists from Tamil Nadu
People from Cuddalore district
Living people
1951 births
Annamalai University alumni
Indian computational chemists
Indian emigrants to the United States
American people of Indian Tamil descent
20th-century Indian chemists